Godfrey Stanley Wilbee (born 12 May 1932) was a member of the House of Commons of Canada from 1988 to 1993. Born in Vancouver, British Columbia, he was a medical doctor by career.

He was elected in the 1988 federal election at the Delta electoral district for the Progressive Conservative party. He served in the 34th Canadian Parliament but lost to John Cummins of the Reform Party in the 1993 federal election.

External links
 

1932 births
Living people
Physicians from British Columbia
Members of the House of Commons of Canada from British Columbia
Politicians from Vancouver
Progressive Conservative Party of Canada MPs